Uwe Scholz (31 December 1958 – 21 November 2004) was a German ballet dancer, director, and choreographer.

Life
Scholz was born in Jugenheim (now Seeheim-Jugenheim) in Hesse, Germany on 31 December 1958, and moved as a child to the Landestheater Darmstadt for ballet and music training.

In 1973, he was admitted to John Cranko's Ballet School in Stuttgart, one month before Cranko's death, and studied under Marcia Haydée. Scholz also studied, on scholarship, at Balanchine's School of American Ballet in New York. He graduated from Stuttgart in 1977, and joined the Stuttgart Ballet. At 26 he became the director of the Zürich Ballet, and directed there for the next 6 years, before returning to Germany to become director of the Leipzig Ballet, where he was also chief choreographer. He remained in Leipzig from 1991 until his death. Among his most famous creations are Mozart's Great Mass, Pax Questuosa by Udo Zimmermann, Berlioz's Symphonie fantastique, The Red and the Black by Stendhal, and much else. In 1993 he was appointed professor at the University of Music and Theatre Leipzig.

He died on 21 November 2004 in Berlin.

Work

Awards
 Omaggio Alla Danza (1987)
 Order of Merit of the Federal Republic of Germany (1996)
  (Theatre prize of the Bavarian State Government) in the dance category (1998)
 Deutscher Tanzpreis (1999)

Media links

References

External links
Site dedicated to his works

1958 births
2004 deaths
People from Darmstadt-Dieburg
German choreographers
Recipients of the Cross of the Order of Merit of the Federal Republic of Germany
Academic staff of the University of Music and Theatre Leipzig